The Ludicrous Lollipops was a band formed in Coventry in the late 1980s. The initial members were all students at the University of Warwick who together produced a noisy, high tempo version of rock and roll. First and foremost a live act, they toured the UK extensively and attracted a loyal following who were dressed from head to toe in clothing from the band's extensive line of merchandise. The band was as active in its own marketing as it was with its music and members of the fan club were regularly sent information about the band, along with a free lollipop.

Their first record was the Mush EP, a 7-inch vinyl sleeved in luminous pink - luminous colours featured heavily with this band, from clothing to guitars and experimental hair styles. The EP was released on their own record label and sold several hundred copies.
The band's career was given a boost when the NME's Steve Lamacq wrote a couple of favourable reviews and mentioned the band to the London A&R crowd who frequented the Bull and Gate in Kentish Town. This led to the band signing a publishing deal with London Records and a recording contract with Damaged Goods.

They went on to release another EP, A Part and a six-inch single Talk before disbanding in 1993.

Discography 
Mush EP (7 ": Crazy Ape Bonkers Phonogram Production Company) 1990
Mindgames
Firedance
Worlds Away

Scrumdiddlyumptious (12 ": Damaged Goods) 1991
Lies About My Life
Brag
Time Spent Hiding
Smile

A Part (12 ": Damaged Goods) 1992
A Part
Disinheritence
Godiva

Talk (6 ": Damaged Goods) 1992
Talk
Tag

References 
 Steve Lamacq refers to Ludicrous Lollipops as a band you might not have heard of
 Japanese article confirming the band's notability, probably.

External links
 Birdpoo
 Damaged Goods

Musical groups from Coventry
British rock and roll music groups
English rock music groups